The Automobile Club of America (ACA) was the first automobile club formed in America in 1899. The club was dissolved in 1932 following the Great Depression and declining membership.

History

On June 7, 1899, a group of gentlemen auto racers met at the Waldorf-Astoria Hotel in Manhattan and founded the Automobile Club of America. The Automobile Club of America was officially incorporated on August 15, 1899 in order to "maintain a social club devoted to the sport of automobilism and to its development throughout the country". The original directors of the club were: Frank C. Hollister, Charles R. Flint, George Moore Smith, Winslow E. Busby, Whitney Lyon, George F. Chamberlain, Homer W. Hedge, and William Henry Hall of New York City and V. Everit Macy of Scarborough-on-Hudson. While it was called the Automobile Club of America, it was really a local organization.

In 1907, the organization built its clubhouse, which was essentially a garage at 247 West 54th Street with a terra-cotta exterior. Architect Ernest Flagg "designed a sophisticated factorylike building with great banks of metal windows, set in a rich screen of glazed terra cotta, particularly fulsome on the second floor. There, a double-height assembly hall, modeled on one at Château de Cheverny in the Loire Valley, ran 100 feet across the building’s front, adjacent to a grill room on the same scale at the back." In 1909, after the number of members looking for garage space doubled, the club built an addition on West 55th Street. By 1910, membership in the club was up to 1,000. In 1923, however, the club sold the complex and the original buildings were converted to other uses before being torn down in 2008.

The club relocated to the former Fisk-Harkness townhouse at 12 East 53rd Street and separately negotiated blocks of space in garages around Manhattan. Furthermore, 12 East 53rd Street was close to several other clubhouses along Fifth Avenue, including those of the University Club, Union Club, Calumet Club, Knickerbocker Club, and Metropolitan Club. The Club received a $190,000 mortgage on the new building in early 1924. After undergoing $100,000 worth of renovations, the clubhouse was dedicated in April 1925. The clubhouse was among the locations where New York license plates were distributed. Events hosted at the house included a luncheon with a League of Nations Non-Partisan Association official, an annual session of the National Highway Traffic Administration, as well as bridge games and tea dances.

The club had a peak membership of 6,000, but following the Great Depression in the United States, several thousand members left the club. As a result, in January 1932, the Automobile Club's governors voted to dissolve the club. The East 53rd Street building was placed for sale at a foreclosure auction that August, and it was sold to the Mutual Life Insurance Company of New York for $50,000. The building was later renovated into the showroom of art dealer Symons Galleries in 1938.

Prominent members
Among the prominent members of the Club were:

 Charles R. Flint
 Homer Hedge
 V. Everit Macy
 Grant B. Schley
 Arthur H. Woods
 Edmund L. Baylies
 James A. Blair Jr.
 Egerton L. Winthrop Jr.
 James A. Burden Jr.
 Chauncey M. Depew
 Elbert H. Gary
 Alan R. Hawley
 Hamilton Fish Kean
 Clarence H. Mackay
 Juliana Cutting
 William W. Miller
 Dudley Olcott
 Percy Avery Rockefeller
 Henry Rogers Winthrop II
 Henry R. Taylor

References

Sources

See also
 Automobile Racing Club of America (ARCA)
 American Automobile Association (AAA)
 United States Auto Club (USAC)
 Sports Car Club of America (SCCA)

Automobile associations in the United States
Defunct clubs and societies in New York (state)
Organizations established in 1899
Organizations disestablished in 1932
1899 establishments in the United States
1932 disestablishments in the United States
Car culture